DELTA is a cable operator in the Netherlands, providing digital cable television, Internet, and telephone service to both residential and commercial customers in mainly the province of Zeeland. In addition, Delta supplies fiber-to-the-home in large parts of the Netherlands.

DELTA began as a merger between Watermaatschappij Zuidwest-Nederland and Provinciale Zeeuwsche Electriciteits-Maatschappij in 1991, providing electricity, gas, heat, and cable television. On 1 March 2017, the cable division was taken over by the Swedish investment fund EQT. EQT also acquired cable company Caiway by the end of 2017. Both companies are within one holding DELTA Fiber Netherlands as of 1 August 2018.

See also
 Digital television in the Netherlands
 Internet in the Netherlands
 List of cable companies in the Netherlands
 Television in the Netherlands

References

External links
  

Dutch companies established in 1991
Telecommunications companies established in 1991
1991 mergers and acquisitions
2017 mergers and acquisitions
2018 mergers and acquisitions
Telecommunications companies of the Netherlands
Cable television companies of the Netherlands
Internet service providers of the Netherlands